H. formosa may refer to:

 Halgerda formosa, a sea slug
 Hebe formosa, a plant endemic to Tasmania
 Heterandria formosa, an ovoviviparous fish